The Society of Antiquaries of Scotland is the senior antiquarian body of Scotland, with its headquarters in the National Museum of Scotland, Chambers Street, Edinburgh. The Society's aim is to promote the cultural heritage of Scotland.

The usual style of post-nominal letters for fellows is FSAScot.

History

The Society is the oldest antiquarian society in Scotland, and the second-oldest in Britain after the Society of Antiquaries of London.  Founded by David Erskine, 11th Earl of Buchan on 18 December 1780, John Stuart, 3rd Earl of Bute, the former prime minister, was elected the first President.  It was incorporated by Royal Charter in 1783, in the same year as the Royal Society of Edinburgh, and in their early years both societies shared accommodation on George Street and in the Royal Institution building on The Mound. Members of the Society collected artefacts of interest to Scottish history and culture from its foundation, and soon the Society developed a sizeable collection.  In November 1851 the signing of a Deed of Conveyance with the Board of Manufactures on behalf of Parliament made the Society collections National Property. In 1891 the antiquaries moved into the purpose-built Scottish National Portrait Gallery and National Museum of Antiquities of Scotland, located on Queen Street. The National Museum of Antiquities of Scotland Act 1954 transferred the powers and duties relating to the Museum, previously vested in the Society of Antiquaries and the National Galleries, to a new Board.

Alexander Rhind left a bequest to the Society to fund a lecture series, the Rhind Lectures are still hosted by the Society; an online recording of these prestigious lectures has been made available to the public since 2009.

Objects
The Society of Antiquaries of Scotland is a charitable organisation whose purpose is set out in its Royal Charter from 1783: 

 

The first Law of the Society focuses this further:

The Society today is concerned with every aspect of the human past in Scotland. It draws on a wide range of experience through the Fellowship, and provides a voice for Scotland's heritage independent of the opinions of Government, University, or Agency. The Society is consulted by a wide range of organisations from central government to academic funding bodies such as the Arts & Humanities Research Council. The Society makes written responses to numerous consultations, some jointly with Archaeology Scotland (formerly CSA) and the Scottish Group of the Chartered Institute for Archaeologists. The Society worked closely with the Historic Environment Advisory Council for Scotland (HEACS was abolished by the Public Services Reform (Scotland) Act 2010 as part of the Scottish Government's policy to simplify the landscape of public bodies), and gave evidence to their working groups on heritage protection legislation and properties in care. The Society has also been actively involved in the Built Environment Forum Scotland, an umbrella body for NGOs in the built and historic environment sectors.

Fellowship
Members of the Society have, since 1823, been known as Fellows of the Society. There are now thousands of Fellows spread across the globe, including Honorary Fellows elected for their outstanding scholarship. Fellowship recognises a persons support and contributions to the purpose and mission of the Society, and Fellows are permitted to use the post-nominals FSAScot (NB Not FSA (Scot) or similar). The Society has an international membership of around 3000 Fellows and a maximum of 25 Honorary Fellows. Admission to the Society is by election, and candidates must be supported by existing Fellows. The names of those seeking admission are then circulated to the whole Fellowship. Elections are held annually at the Anniversary Meeting (AGM) on St Andrew's Day, 30 November. Fundamental to being a candidate for election to the Fellowship is an interest or involvement in Scotland's past. Candidates are advised of the outcome of the election shortly after the ballot.

Supporting research

A major part of the Society's programme is support for research into Scotland's past, and there are various grants and awards to assist different kinds of work, from survey and excavation to finds analysis and archival research.

Other prizes and awards
The Society also encourages best practice and continued research into Scotland's past through various prizes and awards.

The RBK Stevenson Award - This award is offered annually in recognition of the article published in the Proceedings on a topic that best reflects the scholarship and high standards of this distinguished individual, who was for many years the Keeper of the National Museum of Antiquities of Scotland and was President of the Society between 1975 and 1978.
The Dorothy Marshall Medal - Awarded every three years by the Council of the Society for an outstanding contribution, in a voluntary capacity, to Scottish archaeological or related work.
The Murray Medal for History - Awarded biennially to recognise original research published by the Society into the history of Scotland in the medieval and/or early modern periods (c AD 500 to AD 1700).
Chalmers-Jervise Prize - Awarded biennially for the best paper published by the Society to cover any subject in the prehistory or archaeology of Scotland before AD 1100.

Lectures and events
The Society hosts monthly lectures, usually between October and May, and generally held in both Edinburgh and Aberdeen, although some are jointly hosted with other Societies elsewhere in Scotland.  The Society can also fund other Societies to invite a lecturer to them; this lecture is called the Buchan Lecture.

In addition, the Society hosts the prestigious Rhind Lectures, a series of six lectures, often presented by a single lecturer over a weekend.  These allow the lecturer to present their topic in much greater detail and depth than otherwise possible, and are often published.  The Rhind lectures began in 1874 after the death of Alexander Rhind who left the residue of his estate to endow a lectureship in the Society and there have now been over 130 lectures and many have become the published textbook for a generation.

Society lectures and other events are now recorded where possible and placed online on the Society website free to view.
The Rhind Lectures are similarly recorded and available to view since 2009.

Publications

The Society of Antiquaries of Scotland has three main publishing branches:

Peer-reviewed Books, previously known as monographs, covering a wide variety of topics in the history and archaeology of Scotland.
The Proceedings of the Society of Antiquaries of Scotland, a yearly peer-reviewed journal covering the latest archaeological and historical research in Scotland.  The Society has made the entire run of the Proceedings since 1851, and its predecessor Archaeologica Scotica back to 1792, freely available on the internet.
Scottish Archaeological Internet Reports (SAIR) is a peer-reviewed online publication that includes larger and more data-rich projects. It is freely accessible without subscription or payment.

There is also a regular Society Newsletter, and the Society publishes book reviews on their website.

List of presidents of the Society of Antiquaries of Scotland

 Thomas Bruce, 7th Earl of Elgin (1823 to 1841)
 James Bruce, 8th Earl of Elgin (1841 to 1843)
 Schomberg Kerr, 9th Marquess of Lothian (1876 to 1890)
 Sir Herbert Maxwell, 7th Baronet (1900 to 1913)
 John Abercromby, 5th Baron Abercromby (1913 to 1918)
 Sir George Macdonald (1933 to 1940)
 Sir John Stirling-Maxwell of Pollock (1945 to 1950)
 Major General James Scott-Elliott (1965 to 1967)
 Professor Stuart Piggott (1967 to 1972)
 Kenneth A. Steer (1972 to 1975)
 Robert B. K. Stevenson (1975 to 1978)
 Dr Ronald G. Cant (1978 to 1981)
 Stuart Maxwell (1981 to 1984)
 Professor Leslie Alcock (1984 to 1987)
 Professor David J. Breeze (1987 to 1990)
 Dr Anna Ritchie (1990 to 1993)
 Professor Gordon Maxwell (1993 to 1996)
 Professor Michael Lynch (1996 to 1999)
 Dr Graham Ritchie (1999 to 2002)
 Lisbeth Thoms (2002 to 2005)
 Professor Roger Mercer (2005 to 2008)
 Dr Barbara Crawford (2008 to 2011)
 Alan Saville (2011 to 2014)
 Dr David Caldwell (2014 to 2020)
 Professor Ian Ralston (2020 to present)

Notable vice presidents
 Sir Walter Scott (1827 to 1829)
 Sir James Young Simpson (1860 to 1870)
 Dr John Alexander Smith (1870 to 1873)

See also
 Archaeology Scotland (1944)
 Glasgow Archaeological Society (1856)
 Scottish History Society (1886)
 List of Antiquarian Societies

References

External links
 Society of Antiquaries of Scotland website
 Society of Antiquaries Facebook Page
 The Society Of Antiquaries Of Scotland Scanning Project, including the online archive of Proceedings of the Society of Antiquaries Scotland
 Scottish Archaeological Internet Reports
 Scottish Archaeological Research Framework project run by the Society

1780 establishments in Scotland
Archaeological organizations
Archaeological professional associations
Archives in Scotland
Archaeology of Scotland
Learned societies of Scotland
Antiquaries of Scotland
Organizations established in 1780
Text publication societies
History of literature in Scotland
Historical societies of the United Kingdom
History organisations based in Scotland